Darren McKenzie-Potter (born 16 October 1969) is a New Zealand cyclist. He competed in two events at the 1996 Summer Olympics.

References

External links
 

1969 births
Living people
New Zealand male cyclists
Olympic cyclists of New Zealand
Cyclists at the 1996 Summer Olympics
Cyclists from Auckland
20th-century New Zealand people